Pereskiopsis diguetii,  synonym Pereskiopsis spathulata, is a species of cactus in the subfamily Opuntioideae.

References

Alfilerillo, Tasajillo, Cola del Diablo at Desert Tropicals

Opuntioideae